Kellett may refer to:

Kellett (surname)
Kellett Island, a former island in Hong Kong.
Kellett Autogiro Corporation, a former American aircraft manufacturer
Kellett KD-1 (a.k.a. Kellett R-2), a 1930s American autogyro
Kellett XR-10, a military transport helicopter
Kellett Baronets, a title in the Baronetage of the United Kingdom
Kellett Bay, a bay in Hong Kong
Kellett Fellowship, a prize awarded at Columbia College
Kellett railway station, in Kellett, Manitoba, Canada